Harry Hess (born July 5, 1968) is a Canadian record producer, singer and guitarist best known as the frontman for the Canadian hard rock band Harem Scarem.

Hess has used his recording studio (Vespa Music Group) to work with many famous acts, which include: Cancer Bats, Billy Talent, Muse, Three Days Grace, Thornley, My Darkest Days, Rides Again, Simple Plan, Ali Slaight, Our Lady Peace, Kalen Porter, Ryan Malcolm, Sarah Harmer, Julian Austin, Nikki Kerkhof, Great Big Sea, Blue Rodeo, Dean Delannoit, Die Mannequin, Dragonette, Finger 11, RyanDan, Natalia Druyts. In 2021 he was involved in the Grammy-winning album Mendó by Alex Cuba.

Discography

Blind Vengeance
A Taste of Sin (1984)
Blind Vengeance (1985)

Harem Scarem
Harem Scarem (1991)
Mood Swings (1993)
Voice of Reason (1995)
Karma Cleansing / Believe (1997)
Big Bang Theory (1998)
Weight of the World (2002)
Higher (2003)
Overload (2005)
Human Nature (2006)
Hope (2008)
Mood Swings II (2013)
Thirteen (2014)
United (2017)
Change The World (2020)

Rubber
Rubber (1999)
Ultra Feel (2001)

Solo
Just Another Day (2003)
Living in Yesterday (2012)

First Signal
First Signal (2010)
One Step Over the Line (2016)
Line of Fire (2019)
Close to the Edge (2022)
Face Your Fears (2023)

Guest appearances/collaborations
Doctor Rock & The Wild Bunch – Eye of the Hurricane (1991) – Vocals
Lee Aaron – Some Girls Do (1991) – Background vocals
Doctor Rock & The Wild Bunch – Stark Raving Mad (1994)  – Vocals
T.O. Joker – Life Goes On (1994) – Engineer, Background vocals
Xntrik – Kiss the Cow (1994) – Producer
Honeymoon Suite – 13 Live (1994) – Engineer, Mixer
Mystery – Backwards (1995) – Producer (with Pete Lesperance), engineer, Mixer
Lame – Ol' Doctor Bomb (1996) – Producer (with Pete Lesperance)
Midpoint – Midpoint (1996) – Producer
Ritual – Hate (1996) – Producer, Mixer
Dayna Manning – Volume 1 (1997) – Engineer, Background vocals
Fall From Grace – Within the Savage Garden (1997) – Backing vocals
Samad – Samad (1997) – Lead vocals: Track 2: "Land of Paradise"
Steve Holliday – Stark Raving Mad (1997) – Producer, Mixer
Xntrik – Focus (1997) – Producer
Fiore – Body Electric (1998) – Producer
Fiore – Today Till' Tomorrow (1998) – Producer (with Pete Lesperance)
Fiore – All I Feel (1998) – Producer
Fiore – The Best Of (1999) – Producer
Naro – Press Play (2000) – Engineer, Mixer, Keyboards, Vocals
Rafa Martin – Corazon De Hierro (2000) – Engineer, Backing vocals
Stupid Angel – Stupid Angel (2000) – Producer (with Pete Lesperance), Mixer, Backing vocals
Great Big Sea – Sea of No Cares (2002) – Engineer, Mixer
John Boswell – Stranger in the Mirror (2002) – Mixer
Frost – Raise Your Fist to Metal (2003) – Lead vocals: Track 1: "Stay"
Gary Hughes – Once and Future King Part II (2003) Lead vocals: Track 12: "Once and Future King"
Maureen Leeson – aka MOE (2003) – Mixer
Billy Klippert – Billy Klippert (2004) – Producer, composer, backing vocals
Voices of Rock – MMVII (2007) – Vocals: Track 6: "Irresistible"
Liberty N' Justice – Light It Up (2010) – Vocals: Track 11: "Beautiful Decision"
Shining Line – Shining Line (2010) – Vocals: Track 2: "Amy"
First Signal – First Signal (2010) – Lead vocals on all tracks
 Magnus Karlsson's Free Fall – Kingdom of Rock (2015) – Lead Vocals: Track 9: "A Heart So Cold"

References

1968 births
Living people
Canadian male singers
Canadian rock singers
Musicians from Oshawa
Canadian record producers
Canadian songwriters
Frontiers Records artists